Boronia umbellata, commonly known as the Orara boronia, is a plant in the citrus family Rutaceae and is endemic to a small area on the north coast of New South Wales. It is an erect shrub with many branches, aromatic, pinnate leaves and clusters of up to ten dark pink flowers in the leaf axils.

Description
The eight stamens alternate in length with those near the sepals longer than those near the petals. Flowering occurs from June to November and the fruit is a smooth capsule.

Taxonomy and naming
Boronia umbellata was first formally described in 1990 by Peter H. Weston and the description was published in Telopea. The specific epithet (umbellata) is a Latin word meaning "like an umbrella", referring to the umbel-like inflorescences.

Distribution and habitat
The Orara boronia grows in and near damp gullies in forest but is only known from a few locations between Lower Bucca and Glenreagh near Coffs Harbour.

Conservation
This boronia is classed as "vulnerable" under the Australian Government Environment Protection and Biodiversity Conservation Act 1999 and the New South Wales Government Biodiversity Conservation Act 2016. The main threats to the species are habitat disturbance associated with road works and timber harvesting, including land clearing.

References 

umbellata
Flora of New South Wales
Plants described in 1990